West Water Reservoir (sometimes Westwater Reservoir) is an artificial reservoir in the Pentland Hills, Scottish Borders,  west of West Linton, and  south west of Edinburgh. It is an important site for wildfowl and is designated as a SSSI and a Ramsar site.

Description
West Water reservoir was opened in 1969 with an earthwork dam on the West Water, a tributary of the Lyne Water which, in turn, is a tributary of the River Tweed. The reservoir is surrounded by the North Slipperfield Estate which manages the land for rough grazing and shooting.

Archaeology
Erosion caused by the creation of the reservoir exposed an Early Bronze Age flat cist cemetery. When this was excavated the archaeologists found nine surviving cists. These contained remains from both inhumations and cremations and most of the deceased were sub-adult or young adults. Evidence of floral tributes was found in three burials and grave goods were also found.

Fishing
West Water reservoir is used by fly fishing anglers and is stocked with brown trout. The fishing rights were transferred from Scottish Water to the local angling club in 2003.

Conservation
West Water Reservoir is a Site of Special Scientific Interest and a Ramsar site. The reason for this is that in the autumn and winter the reservoir is host to a large roost of pink-footed geese which, in the years 2003–2008 had an average peak number of over 40,000 birds, almost 115 of the total population of this species. In addition to the pink-footed geese there is a diverse community of wildlife around the reservoir including breeding common gull, common ringed plover, dunlin and common tern. Other important wintering and passage species include common goldeneye, barnacle goose, tufted duck and Eurasian teal.

See also
List of reservoirs and dams in the United Kingdom
Baddinsgill Reservoir
Fruid Reservoir
Megget Reservoir
Talla Reservoir

References

External links 

Wildfowl and Wetlands Trust monitoring of Greenland/Iceland pink-footed goose
 
SPA designation
Further details

Ramsar sites in Scotland
Special Protection Areas in Scotland
Reservoirs in the Scottish Borders
Sites of Special Scientific Interest in Tweeddale and Ettrick and Lauderdale